The 1999 UCI Mountain Bike World Cup were the 1999 mountain biking world cup races and were held in three disciplines: Cross-country, Downhill and Dual for both men and women.

Cross country

Dual

Downhill

Schedule

Men's final table

Women's final table

See also
 1999 UCI Mountain Bike World Championships
 UCI Mountain Bike World Cup

References

 M
 W

UCI Mountain Bike World Cup
Mountain Bike World Cup